Daman Mills is an American voice actor and ADR Director from Seattle, Washington. He is known for his work in anime and video game dubs, and works frequently with Square Enix, Funimation, Crunchyroll, Bang Zoom! Entertainment, Studiopolis and Sound Cadence Studios.

Filmography

Anime series

Films

Video games

Animated series
 RWBY (2017), Leonardo Lionheart

Web series
 Red vs. Blue (2020), Diesel

References

External links
 
 
 

Living people
American male voice actors
Place of birth missing (living people)
21st-century American male actors
American voice directors
Funimation
21st-century LGBT people
Year of birth missing (living people)
American gay actors